Graeme Scott Townshend (born October 23, 1965) is a Jamaican-born Canadian retired ice hockey right winger. He was the first Jamaican-born player to play in the National Hockey League (NHL), and played 45 games in the NHL between 1990 and 1993. The rest of his career, which lasted from 1989 to 1999, was spent in the minor leagues.

Playing career
Prior to starting his professional career, Townshend played four seasons at RPI in ECAC Hockey, serving as a team captain during the 1987–88 season. He also played for the Mimico Monarchs of the Central Junior "B" Hockey League.

Townshend started his National Hockey League career with the Boston Bruins. He scored his first NHL goal on February 2, 1991 in Boston's 6-2 loss at Pittsburgh. He also played with the New York Islanders and Ottawa Senators. His NHL career lasted from 1990 to 1994.

He played in the American Hockey League (AHL) for the Maine Mariners, Capital District Islanders, and Prince Edward Island Senators. Townshend also played in the International Hockey League with the Houston Aeros, Minnesota Moose, and Utah Grizzlies and in the Western Professional Hockey League for the Lake Charles Ice Pirates. His professional playing career lasted for 10 seasons. Townshend was distinguished by the International Hockey League and the Western Professional Hockey League as the Man of The Year for his leadership on and off the ice and for his contributions to his community.

Post-playing career
After his retirement, Townshend coached professional hockey for the Macon Whoopee of the Central Hockey League and the Greensboro Generals of the ECHL.

For four years, he served as the player development coordinator for the NHL's San Jose Sharks (one of only 3 in the NHL). His primary responsibility was to prepare all Sharks players and prospects with the skills required for the "new" NHL, most notably, enhancing their skating skills.

On September 9, 2008, he was hired as the skating coach for the NHL's Toronto Maple Leafs. He held the position until the end of the 2012 season.

In December 2011, Townshend was approached by E. J. Phillipps, co-founder of the Jamaican Olympic Ice Hockey Federation (JOIHF) and asked to serve as its first head coach. As a head coach, he organized the first player identification and tryout camp for the new organization in August 2014. Townshend continues to be a head coach of the Jamaica men's national junior team, with aspirations of making it to the Winter Olympics.

Townshend was inducted into the Canadian Black Hockey Hall of Fame.

Personal life
Townshend was born in Kingston, Jamaica, but was raised in Toronto, Ontario, Canada when his family moved there in 1969. He has a brother, Kurt, who was also born in Kingston, Jamaica, and sister, Laurie, who was born in Toronto, Ontario. He is married to Lori-Ann Townshend.

Career statistics

Regular season and playoffs

References

External links
 

1965 births
Living people
Black Canadian ice hockey players
Boston Bruins players
Canadian expatriate ice hockey players in the United States
Canadian ice hockey coaches
Canadian ice hockey right wingers
Capital District Islanders players
ECHL coaches
Houston Aeros (1994–2013) players
Jamaican emigrants to Canada
Jamaican expatriates in Canada
Jamaican ice hockey players
Lake Charles Ice Pirates players
Maine Mariners players
Minnesota Moose players
New York Islanders players
Ottawa Senators players
Prince Edward Island Senators players
Rensselaer Polytechnic Institute alumni
RPI Engineers men's ice hockey players
San Jose Sharks coaches
Sportspeople from Kingston, Jamaica
Ice hockey people from Toronto
Toronto Maple Leafs coaches
Undrafted National Hockey League players
Utah Grizzlies (IHL) players